André Guillabert (15 June 1918 – 24 August 2010) was a Senegalese politician and diplomat. Guillabert was a member of the Senegalese Senate from June 1958 to July 1959. He was also elected to the French senate in 1958. Guillabert was Foreign Minister of Senegal briefly in 1962.

References

 

1918 births
2010 deaths
Foreign ministers of Senegal
Members of the Senate (Senegal)
French Senators of the Fourth Republic
Senegalese diplomats
Government ministers of Senegal
Senators of French West Africa